This page details the career achievements of American basketball player Dennis Rodman.

NAIA Awards

Basketball Times National Player of the Year: 1986 

3-time NAIA All American: 1983, 1984, 1985

2-time All NAIA Selection
First Team: 1985
Second Team: 1984

All-National Tournament honor : 1984, 1985

3-time OIC Player of the Year :1983, 1984, 1985

3-time District 9 Player of the Year

No. 10 Jersey retired by Southeastern Oklahoma St

NBA Awards

Naismith Memorial Basketball Hall of Fame Class of 2011

5-time NBA Champion: 1989, 1990, 1996, 1997, 1998

2-time NBA Defensive Player of the Year: 1990, 1991

IBM Award: 1992

8-time NBA All-Defensive Selection
First Team: 1989-93, 1995, 1996
Second Team: 1994

2-time All-NBA Third Team: 1992, 1995

2-time NBA All-Star: 1990, 1992

Ranked #48 on the 2009 revision of SLAM Magazine's Top 50 Players of All-time

Michigan Sports Hall of Fame Class of 2017

No. 10 Jersey retired by Detroit Pistons

NBA career statistics

Regular season 

|-
| style="text-align:left;"| 
| style="text-align:left;"| Detroit
| 77 || 1 || 15.0 || .545 || .000 || .587 || 4.3 || .7 || .5 || .6 || 6.5
|-
| style="text-align:left;"| 
| style="text-align:left;"| Detroit
| 82 || 32 || 26.2 || .561 || .294 || .535 || 8.7 || 1.3 || .9 || .5 || 11.6
|-
|  style="text-align:left; background:#afe6ba;"| †
| style="text-align:left;"| Detroit
| style="background:#cfecec;"|82 || 8 || 26.9 || style="background:#cfecec;"| .595 || .231 || .626 || 9.4 || 1.2 || .7 || .9 || 9.0
|-
|  style="text-align:left; background:#afe6ba;"| †
| style="text-align:left;"| Detroit
| style="background:#cfecec;"| 82 || 43 || 29.0 || .581 || .111 || .654 || 9.7 || .9 || .6 || .7 || 8.8
|-
| style="text-align:left;"| 
| style="text-align:left;"| Detroit
| style="background:#cfecec;"| 82 || 77 || 33.5 || .493 || .200 || .631 || 12.5 || 1.0 || .8 || .7 || 8.2
|-
| style="text-align:left;"| 
| style="text-align:left;"| Detroit
| 82 || 80 || 40.3 || .539 || .317 || .600 || style="background:#cfecec;"| 18.7 || 2.3 || .8 || .9 || 9.8
|-
| style="text-align:left;"| 
| style="text-align:left;"| Detroit
| 62 || 55 || 38.9 || .427 || .205 || .534 || style="background:#cfecec;"| 18.3 || 1.6 || .8 || .7 || 7.5
|-
| style="text-align:left;"| 
| style="text-align:left;"| San Antonio
| 79 || 51 || 37.8 || .534 || .208 || .520 || style="background:#cfecec;"| 17.3 || 2.3 || .7 || .4 || 4.7
|-
| style="text-align:left;"| 
| style="text-align:left;"| San Antonio
| 49 || 26 || 32.0 || .571 || .000 || .676 || style="background:#cfecec;"| 16.8 || 2.0 || .6 || .5 || 7.1
|-
|  style="text-align:left; background:#afe6ba;"| †
| style="text-align:left;"| Chicago
| 64 || 57 || 32.6 || .480 || .111 || .528 || style="background:#cfecec;"| 14.9 || 2.5 || .6 || .4 || 5.5
|-
|  style="text-align:left; background:#afe6ba;"| †
| style="text-align:left;"| Chicago
| 55 || 54 || 35.4 || .448 || .263 || .568 || style="background:#cfecec;"| 16.1 || 3.1 || .6 || .3 || 5.7
|-
|  style="text-align:left; background:#afe6ba;"| †
| style="text-align:left;"| Chicago
| 80 || 66 || 35.7 || .431 || .174 || .550 || style="background:#cfecec;"| 15.0 || 2.9 || .6 || .2 || 4.7
|-
| style="text-align:left;"| 
| style="text-align:left;"| L.A. Lakers
| 23 || 11 || 28.6 || .348 || .000 || .436 || 11.2 || 1.3 || .4 || .5 || 2.1
|-
| style="text-align:left;"| 
| style="text-align:left;"| Dallas
| 12 || 12 || 32.4 || .387 || .000 || .714 || 14.3 || 1.2 || .2 || .1 || 2.8
|- class="sortbottom"
| style="text-align:center;" colspan="2" | Career
| 911 || 573 || 31.7 || .521 || .231 || .584 || 13.1 || 1.8 || .7 || .6 || 7.3
|- class="sortbottom"
| style="text-align:center;" colspan="2" | All-Star
| 2 || 0 || 18.0 || .364 || - || - || 8.5 || .5 || .5 || .5 || 4.0

NBA regular season leader
Rebounding: 1992 (18.7), 1993 (18.3), 1994 (17.3), 1995 (16.8), 1996 (14.9), 1997 (16.1), 1998 (15.0)

Offensive rebounds: 1991 (361), 1992 (523), 1993 (367), 1994 (453), 1996 (356), 1997 (320)

Defensive rebounds: 1992 (1,007), 1994 (914), 1998 (780)

Field goal percentage: 1989 (.595, 316-531)

Career performances

Top rebounding performances

NAIA collegiate records
Most rebounds in an NAIA tournament game: 32, Southeastern Oklahoma vs. St. Thomas Aquinas (N.Y.), 1986  "Rodman also had 46 points" 
tied with Ken Remley, West Virginia Wesleyan vs. Whittier (Calif.), 1959

South Eastern Oklahoma St records
Most Field goals made in a game: 21, Southeastern Oklahoma vs. Bethany Nazarene, 1985
Highest Field Goal percentage in a game: .917 (11-12), Southeastern Oklahoma vs. Texas Wesleyan, 1983
Most Rebounds in a game: 32, Southeastern Oklahoma vs. Cameron(regular season), 1986; Southeastern Oklahoma vs. St. Thomas Aquinas, 1986(playoffs); 
Most Rebounds in a season: 605, 1984-85 - Rodman also holds the #2 (510) and # 3 (392) spots.
Most Rebounds in a tournament: 95, 1985 (this is one shy of the all time NAIA record of 96).
Most Career Rebounds: 1507, 1983-86 - This was achieved in 3 seasons, the #2 spot is more than 500 rebounds behind in 4 seasons.

At the end of Rodman's college basketball career he ranked 2nd in career points, 1st in Rebounds, 1st in steals, and 1st in blocked shots(career steals and blocks have since been broken). 
He was also the all time school season leader (records have since been broken) in blocked shots and steals and second in points.

NBA records

Regular season
Consecutive seasons leading the league in rebounding: 7 (-)

Oldest player in NBA history to lead the league in rebounding:  on 

Seasons leading the league in defensive rebounds: 3
Broken by Kevin Garnett in 

Rebound percentage, career: 23.4%
Rodman also holds all conceivable records for both offensive and defensive rebound percentage.

Rebound percentage, season: 29.7%
Rodman holds seven of the top ten rebound percentage seasons in NBA history.

Only player in NBA history to record 20 or more rebounds in a game for five different teams(Detroit Pistons, San Antonio Spurs, Chicago Bulls, Los Angeles Lakers, Dallas Mavericks)

Seasons leading the league in rebound percentage: 8 (-)

Consecutive seasons leading the league in rebound percentage: 8 (-)

Highest career rebounds per game average since 1973: 13.1 (11,954/911)

Highest average, rebounds per game, in a season since 1972: 18.66
Rodman holds the top five rebounding seasons since 1979

Rebounds as a bench player, game: 25, San Antonio Spurs at Indiana Pacers, 
Tied by John Henson, Milwaukee Bucks at Orlando Magic, April 10, 2013, and by JJ Hickson, Denver Nuggets vs. Portland Trail Blazers, February 25, 2014

Offensive rebounds as a bench player, game: 14, San Antonio Spurs at Indiana Pacers, 
Rodman played 35 minutes. These two records pertain to games played since the  season.

Broken by JJ Hickson, Denver Nuggets vs. Portland Trail Blazers, February 25, 2014

Only player since 1973 to record 1,500 rebounds in a season: 1,530

One of five players in NBA history to record 1,530 rebounds in a season
Joining Wilt Chamberlain, Bill Russell, Jerry Lucas, and Bob Pettit

One of six players in NBA history with multiple seasons averaging 18 rebounds per game
Joining Wilt Chamberlain, Bill Russell, Jerry Lucas, Nate Thurmond and Bob Pettit

One of two players in NBA history to record 500 offensive rebounds in a season: 523
Moses Malone achieved this in three seasons.

One of three players in NBA history with multiple seasons of 400 offensive rebounds: Three seasons
Moses Malone had six seasons and Larry Smith had two seasons.

One of three players in NBA history to record 1,000 defensive rebounds in a season: 1,007

One of two players in NBA history to lead the league in rebounding with three different teams (Detroit Pistons, San Antonio Spurs, Chicago Bulls)
Joined by Wilt Chamberlain (Philadelphia Warriors, Philadelphia 76ers, Los Angeles Lakers)

Only player in NBA history to lead the league in offensive rebounding with three different teams (Detroit Pistons, San Antonio Spurs, Chicago Bulls)

Playoffs
Offensive rebounds, career: 626
Broken by Shaquille O'Neal on

NBA Finals
Offensive rebounds in a game:  11 (twice), Chicago Bulls vs. Seattle SuperSonics on June 7 and June 16, 1996
Tied Elvin Hayes's mark of 11 set on May 27, 1979
Seattle SuperSonics had 12 offensive rebounds as a team on June 16, 1996

Offensive rebounds, half: 7, second half, Chicago Bulls vs. Seattle SuperSonics, June 7, 1996

Offensive rebounds, quarter: 7, third quarter, Chicago Bulls vs. Seattle SuperSonics, June 7, 1996

Detroit Pistons franchise records

Regular season

Highest field goal percentage, season: .595 (316-531)
Rebounds, season: 1,530
Rebounding average, season: 18.7 (1,530/82)
Rebounds, game: 34, vs. Indiana Pacers, March 4, 1992 
Rebounds, half: 21, second half, vs. Indiana Pacers, March 4, 1992
Offensive rebounding average: 4.4 (-)
Offensive rebounds, season: 523
Offensive rebounding average, season: 6.4 (523/82)
Offensive rebounds, game: 18, vs. Indiana Pacers, March 4, 1992 
Offensive rebounds, half: 11, second half, vs. Indiana Pacers, March 4, 1992
Offensive rebounds, quarter: 6, fourth quarter, vs. Indiana Pacers, March 4, 1992
Broken by Ben Wallace (7, first quarter, at Phoenix Suns, March 3, 2005)
Defensive rebounds, season: 1,007
Defensive rebounding average, season: 12.34 (765/62)
Defensive rebounds, game: 22, at Sacramento Kings, March 14, 1992

Playoffs (incomplete)

Offensive rebounds, career: 277 (1987-1992)
Broken by Ben Wallace on May 19, 2005
Offensive rebounds, game: 10, at Chicago Bulls, May 28, 1990
Broken by Ben Wallace (11, at Orlando Magic, April 27, 2003)
Offensive rebounds, half: 6, first half, vs. Atlanta Hawks, April 28, 1991
Broken by Ben Wallace on May 9, 2004
Offensive rebounds, quarter: 6, first quarter, vs. Atlanta Hawks, April 28, 1991

San Antonio Spurs franchise records

Regular season

Rebounds, season: 1,367
Rebounding average, season: 17.3 (1,367/79)
Rebounds, game: 32, vs. Dallas Mavericks, January 22, 1994
Rebounds, half: 20, first half, vs. Dallas Mavericks, January 22, 1994
Rebounds, quarter: 15, third quarter, vs. Golden State Warriors, February 26, 1995
Offensive rebounds, season: 453
Offensive rebounding average, season: 5.7 (453/79)
Offensive rebounds, half: 10
Tied by Will Perdue (first half, at Sacramento Kings, April 14, 1997)
Offensive rebounds, quarter: 8, fourth quarter, at Indiana Pacers, January 22, 1995
Defensive rebounds, season: 914
Defensive rebounding average, season: 11.6 (914/79)
Defensive rebounds, game: 23, vs. Dallas Mavericks, January 22, 1994
Tied by Tim Duncan (at Miami Heat, February 1, 2003)
Defensive rebounds, half: 13, first half, vs. Dallas Mavericks, January 22, 1994
Broken by Tim Duncan (14, first half, at Miami Heat, February 1, 2003)

Playoffs

Rebounding average, career: 15.0 (255/17) (1994-1995)
Rebounds, game: 22, vs. Los Angeles Lakers, 
Broken by Tim Duncan on 
Offensive rebounds, game: 12, at Houston Rockets, 
Offensive rebounds, half: 7, at Houston Rockets, 
Tied by Nazr Mohammed on 
Defensive rebounds, game: 16, vs. Los Angeles Lakers, 
Broken by David Robinson on

Chicago Bulls franchise records

Regular season

Rebounds, season: 1,201
Rebounding average, season: 16.1 (883/55)
Rebounds, quarter: 14, first quarter, vs. Orlando Magic, January 3, 1997
Tied with Clifford Ray (fourth quarter, vs. Seattle SuperSonics, March 14, 1972)
Rebounds, overtime: 5, at Dallas Mavericks, March 12, 1998
Tied with Chet Walker (vs. Los Angeles Lakers, December 12, 1972) and Carlos Boozer (vs. Memphis Grizzlies, January 19, 2013)
Offensive rebounds, season: 421
Offensive rebounds, half: 10, twice
10, second half, vs. Los Angeles Clippers, December 23, 1997
10, first half, vs. Denver Nuggets, March 3, 1998
Tied with Charles Oakley (vs. Milwaukee Bucks, March 15, 1986)
Offensive rebounds, quarter: 7, first quarter, vs. Denver Nuggets, March 3, 1998
Tied by Elton Brand (fourth quarter, at Philadelphia 76ers, January 17, 2001)
Offensive rebounds, overtime: 3, vs. Detroit Pistons, March 31, 1998
Broken by Joakim Noah (4, at Detroit Pistons, April 15, 2012)
Defensive rebounds, season: 780

Playoffs
Rebounding average, career: 11.3 (655/58) (1996-1998)
Rebounds, quarter: 10, third quarter, vs. Seattle SuperSonics, 
Offensive rebounds, game: 11, thrice
11, vs. Seattle SuperSonics, 
11, vs. Seattle SuperSonics, 
11, at New Jersey Nets, 
Offensive rebounds, half: 7, second half, vs. Seattle SuperSonics, 
Offensive rebounds, quarter: 7, third quarter, vs. Seattle SuperSonics,

See also
List of National Basketball Association career rebounding leaders
List of National Basketball Association season rebounding leaders
List of National Basketball Association players with most rebounds in a game

References

Rodman, Dennis